Pantami is a district head ward in Gombe Local Government Area of Gombe State, Nigeria. Pantami is located at the terminal southern part of Gombe Local Government area, with Associated Zip Code: 760253. Pantami is one of the largest wards in Gombe local government area with eighteen major polling units.

Polling Units 



Local Government Areas in Gombe State